Gustaf Pelander (23 August 1887 – 9 August 1964) was a Finnish wrestler. He competed in the heavyweight event at the 1912 Summer Olympics.

References

External links
 

1887 births
1964 deaths
Sportspeople from Vaasa
People from Vaasa Province (Grand Duchy of Finland)
Olympic wrestlers of Finland
Wrestlers at the 1912 Summer Olympics
Finnish male sport wrestlers